Denmark competed at the 2022 Winter Paralympics in Beijing, China which took place between 4–13 March 2022. One alpine skier competed.

Administration

Adam Nybo was not able to attend the opening ceremony after testing positive for COVID-19. He was also not able to compete in the men's giant slalom competition.

Michael Møllgaard Nielsen served as Chef de Mission.

Competitors
The following is the list of number of competitors participating at the Games per sport/discipline.

Alpine skiing

See also
Denmark at the Paralympics
Denmark at the 2022 Winter Olympics

References

Nations at the 2022 Winter Paralympics
2022
Winter Paralympics